Black Hawk Down may refer to:

Military 
Battle of Mogadishu (1993), a battle between forces of the United States and Somali militia fighters
1994 Black Hawk shootdown incident, a friendly fire incident over northern Iraq

Arts, entertainment, and media
Black Hawk Down (book), a 1999 book by Mark Bowden about the 1993 Battle of Mogadishu
Black Hawk Down (film), a 2001 film adaptation of Bowden's book, directed by Ridley Scott
Black Hawk Down (soundtrack), the soundtrack to the film of the same name
"Blackhawk Down", a song from the 2000 album Rancid by the American punk rock band Rancid
Delta Force: Black Hawk Down, a 2003 action game based on the events in Somalia

See also
Sikorsky UH-60 Black Hawk, the military helicopter used by the United States in the 1993 Battle of Mogadishu
Black Hawk (disambiguation)